Too Rich: The Secret Life of Doris Duke is a 1999 American four-part television miniseries starring Lauren Bacall and Richard Chamberlain which was first broadcast on CBS on February 21 and 23, 1999. It was based primarily on the book The Richest Girl in the World by Stephanie Mansfield (Pinnacle Books issued a special movie tie-in edition of the book in February 1999) as well as Bob Colacello's two in-depth articles about Ms. Duke in Vanity Fair. Colacello was the magazine's authority on Doris Duke.

The title of the series was derived from the book Too Rich: The Family Secrets of Doris Duke by Pony Duke and Jason Thomas. Manfield's book was the first to be obtained by CBS, which optioned it for a planned miniseries in early 1995. The Duke-Thomas book, which was "being peddled as a miniseries" by the authors months before publication (it was not published until December 1995), was originally optioned earlier that year by the producer Doris Keating, who planned a miniseries of her own.

Too Rich: The Secret Life of Doris Duke presents a dramatized account of the life of the heiress, philanthropist, and once richest woman in the world, Doris Duke. It has since been re-broadcast on The Hallmark Channel, and on Lifetimes combined and presented as a 192-minute movie. The film stars Hayden Panettiere as young Doris Duke, Lindsay Frost as 20- to 50-year-old Doris Duke, and Lauren Bacall as an elderly Doris Duke. Bacall, who had met Doris Duke a few times, was pleased to have been able to appear in a TV miniseries, devoting a few paragraphs to the experience in her autobiography.

While Bacall, Chamberlain and Frost were highly praised for their roles, most reviews of the miniseries were generally unfavorable.  The Orlando Sentinel went so far as to say: "If the real Duke were talking, a curse on the filmmakers would be likely."

Another film about the relationship between Duke and her butler, Bernard Lafferty, Bernard and Doris, directed by Bob Balaban and starring Susan Sarandon and Ralph Fiennes, was released in 2007 to much greater critical acclaim, receiving three Golden Globe and ten Emmy nominations.

Plot outline
Doris Duke, the famous real-life billionairess, is seen going over her life as she prepares to die. Her life includes the early death of her loving father, being raised by a cold mother, two marriages and numerous affairs that still leave her hungry for love, a fascination with mystics and reincarnation, and a disastrous adoption late in life. Even now as she is dying, her roller-coaster life has one last bump in it: her butler, Bernard Lafferty, is suspected of arranging her death so he can get all her money.

Cast
 Lauren Bacall as Doris Duke (elderly)
Hayden Panettiere as Young Doris Duke
 Lindsay Frost as Doris Duke (age 20s to 50s)
 Richard Chamberlain as Bernard Lafferty
 Mare Winningham as Chandi Heffner
 Kathleen Quinlan as Nanaline Duke
 Michael Nouri as Porfirio Rubirosa
 Joe Don Baker as Buck Duke
 Roberta Maxwell as Myra
 Sheila McCarthy as Tammy
 Lisa Banes as Barbara Hutton
 Brian Stokes Mitchell as Duke Kahanamoku
 Brian Dennehy as Louis Bromfield
 Liam Cunningham as Alec Cunningham-Reid

Accolades

References

External links

1999 American television series debuts
1999 American television series endings
1990s American television miniseries
1990s biographical drama films
American biographical drama films
Biographical television films
Films directed by John Erman
CBS original programming